The Only Good Indian is a 2009 American independent Western film directed by Kevin Willmott.

The film was shot almost entirely in Kansas—the only exception being a scene at Missouri's Ha Ha Tonka State Park—featuring locations such as the Monument Rocks and Fort Larned.

Filming took place in 2007-2008, and the movie premiered at the 2009 Sundance Film Festival, subsequently showing at other film festivals. The film won Willmott "Best Director" honors at the American Indian Film Festival, as well as acting honors for Wes Studi and Winter Fox Frank in his debut as the Kickapoo youth.

Plot
The story is set in Kansas during the early 1900s. A Kickapoo youth (newcomer Winter Fox Frank) is taken from his family and forced to attend a distant Indian boarding school, designed to achieve to his assimilation into White society. When he escapes to return to his family, Sam Franklin (Wes Studi), a bounty hunter of Cherokee descent, is hired to find and return him to the school.

Franklin, a former Indian scout for the U.S. Army, has renounced his Native heritage. He has adopted the White Man’s way of life, believing it’s the only way for Indians to survive. Along the way, a tragic incident spurs Franklin’s longtime nemesis, noted `Indian Fighter` Sheriff Henry McCoy (J. Kenneth Campbell), to pursue both Franklin and the boy.

The film featured both the Kickapoo language and members of the Kickapoo tribe.

Cast
 Wes Studi as Sam Franklin
 J. Kenneth Campbell as Sheriff Henry McCoy
 Winter Fox Frank as Charlie
 Paul Butler as Harkin
 Thirza Defoe as Sally
 Christopher Wheatley as Mean Joe
 Laura Kirk as Miss Harris
 Delanna Studi as Aquene

Reception
The film premiered in 2009 at the Sundance Film Festival, and was shown at numerous other festivals. It won awards for its director and leads at the American Indian Film Festival.

Robert W. Butler of the Kansas City Star thought that Wilmott was well-intentioned but did not fully realize the reach of revisionist history. Audiences have liked it but the film has not had wide distribution. The Hollywood Reporter praised Studi's performance.

Travis Keune, reviewing the film at the Saint Louis Film Festival, said that it started with a great premise and, while the execution was flawed, it was worth watching.

References

External links
 
 
 "The Only Good Indian", Sundance Film Festival website

2009 films
American independent films
Cherokee in popular culture
Films about Native Americans
Films shot in Kansas
Films set in Kansas
Films shot in Missouri
Films directed by Kevin Willmott
2000s English-language films
2000s American films